Orke is a river of North Rhine-Westphalia and of Hesse, Germany. It flows into the Eder in Ederbringhausen, Hesse.

See also
List of rivers of North Rhine-Westphalia
List of rivers of Hesse

References

Rivers of North Rhine-Westphalia
Rivers of Hesse
Rivers of Germany